Shanghai Metals Market Information & Technology Co,. Ltd. (SMM) is a metals information provider in China.

History
Founded in 1999 as a Chinese metals market research company, Shanghai Metals Market have been publishing the daily assessment spot prices (SMM Price) for over 100 base metals, precious metals, minor metals, recycled metals, metal powders, compounds, semis, alloys, and rare earths for over 10 years.

Awards
SMM's Shanghai Nonferrous Metals Price Index (SMMI) accurately tracks the overall situation in China's nonferrous metals market and was recognized as such with the 3rd Class National Science & Technology Progress Award in 2008.

External links 
Shanghai Metals Market

Market research companies of China
Metal industry